The False Adam is a 1955 West German comedy film directed by Géza von Cziffra and starring Waltraut Haas, Rudolf Platte and Doris Kirchner.

The film's sets were designed by the art director Albrecht Becker and Herbert Kirchhoff. It was shot at the Wandsbek Studios in Hamburg.

Cast
Waltraut Haas as Renate Meinecke
Rudolf Platte as Adam Waldemar Meinecke, ihr Mann
Doris Kirchner as Mabel, Meyer's daughter
Walter Müller as Robert Bullinger
Loni Heuser as Luise, Meyer's wife
Oskar Sima as Mr. Meyer
Günther Lüders as Jan Piepenbrink
Erni Mangold as Dolly Dobbs
Peter Garden
Karin von Dassel
Hans Schwarz Jr.
Joseph Offenbach
Holger Hagen
Marga Maasberg
Tim Oldehoff
Horst von Otto
Joachim Wolf
Josef Albrecht as waiter
Heinz Frese as husband
Sonja Wilken as young lady

References

External links

1955 comedy films
German comedy films
West German films
Films directed by Géza von Cziffra
Films shot at Wandsbek Studios
German black-and-white films
1950s German films
1950s German-language films